Badam Zar (also Romanized as Bādām Zār and Bādāmzār) is a village in Markazi Rural District, in the Central District of Dashti County, Bushehr Province, Iran. At the 2006 census, its population was 144, in 33 families.

References 

Populated places in Dashti County